Instytut Kultury ('Institute of Culture') is a station of the Minsk Metro.

Instytut Kultury station has been opened on June 26, 1984, in the first stage of the Minsk Metro. Until November 2012, this was the southwestern terminus on the Maskowskaya line. This station is between Ploshcha Lyenina and Hrušaŭka stations.

This station is of the vaulted type, made from monolithic and precast concrete.

Exits of this station lead to trains to Orsha, Academy of Public Administration under the aegis of the President of the Republic of Belarus and Belarusian University of Culture.

Gallery

References

Minsk Metro stations
Railway stations opened in 1984